The Treaty of Königsberg may refer to:

The Treaty of Königsberg (1384), which established alliance between Vytautas the Great of Lithuania and the Teutonic Knights
The Treaty of Königsberg (1390), which guaranteed Samogitian support to Vytautas the Great
The Treaty of Königsberg (1627), which established alliance between Holy Roman Emperor Ferdinand II and George William, Elector of Brandenburg
The Treaty of Königsberg (1656), which established alliance between Charles X Gustav of Sweden and Frederick William, Elector of Brandenburg